The 2020 French Athletics Championships was the 132nd edition of the national championship in outdoor track and field for France. It was held on 12–13 September at Stadium Municipal d'Albi in Albi. A total of 36 events (divided evenly between the sexes) were contested over the two-day competition. The combined track and field events were held separately on 19–20 September at the Stade de Lattre-de-Tassigny in Aubagne.

On 3 April the French Athletics Federation declared that the competition would be postponed from its original setting in Angers from 19 to 21 June, due to the COVID-19 pandemic.

The event was broadcast live on television via L'Équipe. Claire Bricogne, François-Xavier de Châteaufort, Bouabdellah Tahri and Jimmy Vicaut provided commentary and analysis.

Programme

Results

Men

Women

References

Results
Les Championnats de France 2020. French Athletics Federation. Retrieved 2021-03-19.

French Athletics Championships
Athletics Championships
French Athletics Championships
French Athletics Championships
Sport in Albi
French Athletics Championships, 2020